Antal Kocso (born 22 December 1962) is a former international speedway rider from Hungary.

Speedway career 
Kocso reached the final of the Speedway World Championship in the 1988 Individual Speedway World Championship.

He rode in the top tier of British Speedway from 1989-1993, riding for Bradford Dukes. Bradford signed him following an impressive showing at the 1988 Speedway World Pairs Championship at Odsal, where he scored 15 points.

He has been on the podium three times during the Hungarian National Championships.

World final appearances

Individual World Championship
 1988 -  Vojens, Speedway Center - 11th - 6pts

World Pairs Championship
 1988 -  Bradford, Odsal Stadium (with Zoltán Adorján) - 6th - 25pts
 1989 -  Leszno, Alfred Smoczyk Stadium (with Zoltán Adorján) - 6th - 22pts
 1993 -  Vojens, Speedway Center (with József Petrikovics / Zoltán Adorján) - 7th - 10pts

References 

1962 births
Living people
Hungarian speedway riders
Bradford Dukes riders